Kalambay "Bibey" Mutombo (2 October 1961 – 8 August 2008) was a Congolese football manager. He was born in Kinshasa.

He died on 8 August 2008 in Belgium after a long illness.

Clubs managed
 Orlando Pirates, South Africa (Head coach)
 Black Leopards, South Africa (Head coach)
 AS Vita Club, DR Congo (Head coach)
 DRC National Team (Assistant coach)
 R.E. Virton, Belgium (Assistant coach)
 FC Rodange 91, Luxembourg (Head coach)
 Sporting Mertzig, Luxembourg (Head coach)

References

1961 births
2008 deaths
Footballers from Kinshasa
AS Vita Club managers
Black Leopards F.C. managers
Orlando Pirates F.C. managers
Democratic Republic of the Congo football managers
Democratic Republic of the Congo expatriate football managers
Expatriate football managers in Luxembourg
Democratic Republic of the Congo expatriate sportspeople in Luxembourg
Expatriate soccer managers in South Africa
Democratic Republic of the Congo expatriate sportspeople in South Africa
Linafoot managers
Premier Soccer League managers
21st-century Democratic Republic of the Congo people